Zuleima del Pino González, known professionally as Ptazeta, is a Spanish rapper and singer. She was born and raised in Las Palmas. In October 2021, Bizarrap and Ptazeta collaborated on the track "Ptazeta: Bzrp Music Sessions, Vol. 45". It charted 23 on Argentina Hot 100. In 2022, she released the song "Mujerón" with Puerto Rican rapper Villano Antillano. In May 2022, she signed a record deal with Interscope Records. Ptazeta is a lesbian and incorporates queer lyrics in her works.

References 

Living people
Year of birth missing (living people)
People from Las Palmas
Singers from the Canary Islands
Spanish women rappers
21st-century Spanish women singers
21st-century women rappers
Interscope Records artists
LGBT rappers
Spanish LGBT singers
LGBT women
21st-century Spanish LGBT people